Jim Case (born January 28, 1960) is an American college baseball coach, currently serving as head coach of the Jacksonville State Gamecocks baseball team.  He has held that position since the 2002 season.  He played at Louisiana Tech, earning all-conference honors as a catcher before serving as a student assistant coach for one season while completing his undergraduate degree.  He then became an assistant at Mississippi State where he completed a master's degree before moving to UAB.  After ten years, he returned to Mississippi State for a second stint before earning his first head coaching job at Jacksonville State.

Head coaching record

See also
List of current NCAA Division I baseball coaches

References

1968 births
Living people
Baseball catchers
Jacksonville State Gamecocks baseball coaches
Louisiana Tech Bulldogs baseball coaches
Louisiana Tech Bulldogs baseball players
Mississippi State Bulldogs baseball coaches
Mississippi State University alumni
UAB Blazers baseball coaches